Peter Voss, Thief of Millions (German: Peter Voss, der Millionendieb) is a West German adventure television series originally broadcast on ZDF in 1977. It is inspired by the novel Peter Voss, Thief of Millions by Ewald Gerhard Seeliger which has been adapted into films on numerous occasions most recently the 1958 film Peter Voss, Thief of Millions.

References

Bibliography
 Goble, Alan. The Complete Index to Literary Sources in Film. Walter de Gruyter, 1999.

External links
 

1977 German television series debuts
1977 German television series endings
German-language television shows